Shocking Asia II: The Last Taboos is a 1985 mondo documentary film written and directed by Rolf Olsen. It is the sequel to 1974's Shocking Asia. It was followed by a sequel Shocking Asia III: After Dark in 1995.

Content 
The film has no traditional plot, instead showing a series of shocking and disturbing video clips, primarily from Asia. Some content prescribed includes footage of cockfighting, crippled people born with deformities, spiritual rituals, bull fighting and bizarre sexual acts.

References

External links

1985 films
Hong Kong independent films
Hong Kong sequel films
Mondo films
1985 documentary films
Hong Kong documentary films
1980s English-language films
1980s Hong Kong films